The 1902 Miami Redskins football team was an American football team that represented Miami University during the 1902 college football season. Under new head coach Peter McPherson, Miami compiled a 5–3–1 record.

Schedule

Notes

References

Miami
Miami RedHawks football seasons
Miami Redskins football